Vicente García Bernal (5 April 1929 – 26 November 2017) was a Mexican Roman Catholic prelate.

Born in Fresnillo, Zacatecas, García Bernal was ordained to the priesthood in 1953. He served as the Bishop of Ciudad Obregón from 1988 until his retirement in 2005. He died on 26 November 2017 in Ciudad Obregón, Sonora, at the age of 88.

References

External links
 Vicente García Bernal at Catholic-Hierarchy.org 

1929 births
2017 deaths
21st-century Roman Catholic bishops in Mexico
20th-century Roman Catholic bishops in Mexico
People from Fresnillo